Miroslav Bojceski (born 30 December 1968) is a retired Macedonian footballer who played as a midfielder.

External links
 

1968 births
Living people
Footballers from Skopje
Macedonian footballers
Austrian footballers
Macedonian emigrants to Austria
Austrian people of Macedonian descent
FK Vardar players
FK Makedonija Gjorče Petrov players
SV Grödig players
Association football midfielders